Kohei Yusa (25 July 1883 – 25 November 1966) was a Japanese equestrian. He competed in the individual dressage event at the 1928 Summer Olympics.

References

1883 births
1966 deaths
Japanese male equestrians
Olympic equestrians of Japan
Equestrians at the 1928 Summer Olympics
Sportspeople from Miyagi Prefecture